The Conservatory of Music at Brooklyn College (also known as Brooklyn College Conservatory) is the music school of Brooklyn College of the City University of New York (CUNY). It is located on the  Brooklyn College campus in Flatbush, Brooklyn, New York City.

The Conservatory offers undergraduate, graduate, and post-graduate degrees in instrumental and vocal performance, jazz, conducting, composition, music education, music technology, and musicology. Students study with a faculty of distinguished performers, musicologists, theorists, and composers, in addition to a roster of notable guest artists and lecturers.

The conservatory is home to the Brooklyn College Center for Computer Music (BC-CCM) and the H. Wiley Hitchcock Institute for Studies in American Music.

Many members of the faculty also teach at The Juilliard School or the Manhattan School of Music.

See also
 List of concert halls

External links
 
 Center for Computer Music at Brooklyn College
 H. Wiley Hitchcock Institute for Studies of American Music

City University of New York
Brooklyn College
Universities and colleges in Brooklyn
Music schools in New York City